Robert Nichols Montague Hunt (May 19, 1906 – January 18, 1964) was an American poet and long-time partner of Witter Bynner.

Early life

He was born in Pasadena, California, on May 19, 1906, the son of successful architect Myron Hunt and his wife Harriette Boardman. The senior Hunt designed and built a mansion as their family residence. As a young adult, Robert worked briefly for his father, demonstrating that he was a talented designer.

Career
Hunt is the author of a collection of 18 poems, The Early World and other poems, dedicated to his lover, poet Witter Bynner. Hunt edited Bynner's Selected Poems.

Personal life

Hunt and Bynner first met in 1924 through being introduced by historian Paul Horgan. They met again in Santa Fe in 1926 and in Los Angeles in 1928. In 1930 Hunt arrived in Santa Fe again, originally for a visit while recuperating from a stress-related illness. He stayed on as Bynner's lifelong companion. The relationship lasted until Hunt's sudden death by heart attack in 1964.

When living with Bynner, Hunt designed an addition of a wing to Bynner's home. He also designed alterations to their Chapala, Mexico home, which they purchased from Mexican architect Luis Barragán). Hunt also redesigned the living room of Peter Hurd's ranch in San Patricio, New Mexico.

During WWII Hunt could not serve in the military because of health issues. He served on the local draft board for a year. In early 1943 he left Bynner at their second home in Chapala, and returned to the United States to assist the war effort. He went to work on the docks in San Francisco, where the city was deeply engaged in the defense industry and supplying the Pacific.

In 1950, Bynner and Hunt toured Europe. They visited, among others, American writers Thornton Wilder and James Baldwin in Paris, and philosopher George Santayana and Sybille Bedford in Rome.

Bynner and Hunt's ashes are buried near the house where they lived on Atalaya Hill in Santa Fe. The site is marked by a carved stone figure of a weeping dog.

References

1906 births
1964 deaths
20th-century American poets
American gay writers
American LGBT poets
Writers from Santa Fe, New Mexico
American male poets
LGBT people from New Mexico
Writers from Pasadena, California
20th-century American male writers
Poets from California
Poets from New Mexico
20th-century American LGBT people
Gay poets